Mahonia longibracteata is a shrub in the family Berberidaceae, first described as a species in 1917. It is endemic to China, found in Sichuan and Yunnan Provinces.

References

longibracteata
Endemic flora of China
Plants described in 1917